Disney Cruise Line is a cruise line operation that is a subsidiary of The Walt Disney Company. The company was incorporated in 1996 as Magical Cruise Company Limited, through the first vessel, Disney Magic and is domiciled in London, England, with their operational headquarters located in Celebration, Florida.

Disney Cruise Line currently operates five ships: Disney Magic, Disney Wonder, Disney Dream, Disney Fantasy, and Disney Wish. Three ships will join the fleet in 2024 and 2025. The next one was announced to be named Disney Treasure. Disney Cruise Line also owns Castaway Cay, a private island in the Bahamas designed as an exclusive port of call for Disney's ships. A second private destination, Lighthouse Point, a 700-acre property on the southern end of Eleuthera, Bahamas is in the works to open in early 2024. Disney Cruise Line operates the Disney Cruise Line Terminal (Terminal 8) in Port Canaveral, Florida.

The cruise line has experienced some growth over the past several years. In 2011, the company held a 1.95 percent market share and by 2015, Disney Cruise Lines had 2.8 percent of the worldwide cruise market by passenger and 2.4 percent by revenue. However, in 2018, Disney Cruise Lines declined to 2.3 percent of the worldwide cruise market by passenger and 2.2 percent by revenue. In 2021 the market share is 2.2 percent by passenger and 2.7 percent by revenue.

The line pioneered the rotational dining concept, in which guests would rotate with their wait staff through three different main dining rooms.

Background
In 1985, Premier Cruise Line became the licensed partner cruise line with Disney. This allowed Disney characters on their ships and combined cruise, hotel and theme park packages. In 1993, Premier ended their relationship with Disney and signed a new one with Warner Brothers, utilizing the Looney Tunes characters. Premier continued to offer Disney Land and Sea packages while adding Universal Studios as an option. Thus Disney approached both Carnival and Royal Caribbean cruise lines to replace Premier as an exclusive sea partner.

History
When Disney's negotiations with two major cruise lines, Carnival and Royal Caribbean, did not produce results, Disney had cruise ship designs drawn up by February 1994. Meanwhile, Walt Disney Travel Company started signing up other cruise lines to offer packages that included Disney hotels and resorts. On May 3, 1994, Disney announced that they intended to start their own cruise line with operations starting in 1998. Arthur Rodney was selected to serve as the first president of the cruise line tentatively called Disney Vacation Cruises. Disney Cruise Line in 1995 commissioned Disney Magic and Disney Wonder from Fincantieri in Italy. The cruise line was incorporated as Devonson Cruise Company, Limited on February 6, 1996, in the United Kingdom, but soon was renamed Magical Cruise Company Limited on October 1, 1996. The cruise line cost as much as a theme park to start up. In 1996, Magical Cruise Company purchased Gorda Cay as the line's private island. The company spent $25 million over 18 months on the island and renamed it Castaway Cay.

The Disney Magics first cruise was originally scheduled for March 1998 but was postponed twice while the Disney Wonder was scheduled for December 1998. On July 30, 1998, with the first voyage of Magic, the Disney Cruise Line was operational. Also, a 10-year contract was signed with Port Canaveral for its home terminal. With the August 31, 1999, resignation of Rodney as cruise line president, senior operating officer Matt Ouimet was named as his replacement in July. By 2002, the line added seven-day cruises and western Caribbean cruises.

In June 2005, Disney Magic moved its port for the summer cruise season to the Port of Los Angeles. This was temporary for the company's 50th-anniversary celebration of Disneyland and as a test for California expansion. The transfer cruise sold out quicker than expected. Bookings from first time Disney cruisers were up for these cruises by at least 60%. While Disney had wanted additional ships, shipbuilding cost had increased by at least 33% since it built its first two ships. The Disney Magic was transferred to the Mediterranean for an extended stay in 2007. In 2007, Disney announced the building of two new cruise ships. Disney Dream set sail in January 2011, followed closely by Disney Fantasy in 2012. Meyer Werft shipyard, based in Papenburg, Germany, built the new ships.

New Vacation Operation unit
In February 2009, Tom McAlpin left the Disney Cruise Line presidency and was replaced by Karl Holz as president of Disney Cruise Line and New Vacation Operations. In early 2009, Disney and Canaveral Port Authority extended their agreement to 2022 with expansion to the terminal to handle the new class of ships. A re-posting of the Disney Magic to Europe in 2010 adding DCL's first North European cruises with Mediterranean cruises.

With the arrival of Disney Dream in 2011, Disney Wonder was relocated to Los Angeles. With the arrival of Disney Fantasy in 2012, Disney Magic was relocated to New York City in May 2012 for only the Summer season, before relocating to Galveston, Texas.

In late 2012, Disney Wonder began sailing cruises out of Miami, Florida. In 2013, the Disney Magic relocated to Barcelona, Spain and the Disney Wonder relocated to Vancouver, British Columbia, for the summer season. In Autumn 2013, the Magic and the Wonder returned to the United States but switched home ports, with the Magic leaving out of Miami and the Wonder leaving out of Galveston. In January 2014, the Wonder took over for the Magic in Miami and the Magic joined the Dream and Fantasy in Port Canaveral, placing all four ships in the state of Florida for the first time. Since then, the Magic and the Wonder have once again switched places.

At the February 2016 Cruise Critic Cruisers' Choice Awards, three of Disney's ships won 11 category awards. The company ordered three ships of a new class of ship, Triton, in 2016 and 2017. At the company annual meeting on March 3, 2016, Walt Disney Company Chairman Bob Iger announced the first two new ships of the new line which are planned to be built larger than the previous two ships. The first ship joined the line in 2022, with the second expected in 2024. On July 15, 2017, Bob Chapek, President of Walt Disney Parks & Resorts, announced at the D23 Expo that a seventh unnamed ship will join the fleet.

In 2016, the cruise line was looking to buy Egg Island, Eleuthera, Bahamas as another destination for the additional cruise ships. However, opposition from nearby island residents and potential damage to the islands' reefs stopped plans from going forward.

In April 2017, it was announced that Karl Holz would retire as president of Disney Cruise Line on February 15, 2018 and Anthony Connelly assumed the role of president on October 1, 2017. The Canaveral Port Authority Board of Commissioners in January 2019 approved work for Disney's Terminal 8 and adjacent Terminal 10, which would handle more ships when the new class arrived.

With the October 6, 2017 cruise of Disney Magic from New York to the Bahamas, the cruise line held its first Marvel Day at Sea. In October 2018, the cruise line began showing Disney at Sea with D23, a 30-minute entertainment news show that covers the many Disney subsidiaries with input from D23, starting with the  ship.

Disney Signature Experiences unit
Soon after a March 2018 conglomerate reorganized the Disney Parks, Experiences and Products segment division, Disney Cruise Line and New Vacation Operations were renamed Disney Signature Experiences along with a new president, Jeff Vahle.

Disney Cruise Line purchased in early March 2019 another Bahamas destination, the Lighthouse Point property on the island of Eleuthera from the Bahamian Government. The cruise line was looking for another Bahamas location since the announcement of the third ship expansion in 2016.

In February 2020, Disney Wonder moved its home port to New Orleans. From March 14 until July 2021, Disney Cruise Line ships suspended operations due to the COVID-19 pandemic. Sailings resumed in the form of "Staycation Cruises", closed loop cruises of 2 to 4 nights from the United Kingdom ports of Liverpool, Southampton, Newcastle, and Tilbury for London.

Fleet

Current

All of Disney Cruise Line's ships are officially registered in Nassau, Bahamas. Disney Magic began operation July 30, 1998. Disney Wonder began operation on August  1999 and were both built at Fincantieri shipyard, Italy. The ships each contain 875 staterooms and are not identical in their design, with a lot of variations in interior design, restaurants, and entertainment venues. Both contain areas designed exclusively for various age groups, including children, teenagers, and adults. Current itineraries go to Alaska, the Bahamas, the Caribbean, and Europe, depending on the ship. The newer Disney Cruise ships were built in Meyer Werft Shipyard in Germany.

The ships are the first in the industry to be designed and built from the keel up as family cruise liners, with the goal of accommodating and equally satisfying adults and children. Unlike most ships of their type, they do not include casinos. Disney ships also feature ship's horns, affectionately known as the "Mickey horn", which play the opening seven-note theme of "When You Wish Upon a Star" from Disney's Pinocchio, in addition to the traditional horn. The Disney Dream and Disney Fantasy include other tunes on their horn not heard on the Disney Magic and the Disney Wonder, such as "Do You Want to Build a Snowman?", "It's a Small World", and an elongated version of "When You Wish Upon a Star".

The Disney Dream and Disney Fantasy entered service in January 2011 and March 2012, respectively. These ships were built at Meyer Werft shipyard in Papenburg, Germany. They are two decks taller than the Disney Magic and Disney Wonder and have 1,250 staterooms each. The Disney Dream was the first ship to have a water coaster.

On April 29, 2021, Disney Cruise Line stated that Disney Wish would enter service in mid-2022.

Future
In early 2019, the company placed an order for a new class of ship, named in public documents as the Triton class. In 2016, the line announced it would acquire two ships, as yet unnamed, are described as larger than Disney Dream and Disney Fantasy but with an equivalent number of staterooms. A third ship of the class was announced on July 15, 2017 at the D23 Expo. The delivery date was changed because of the COVID-19 pandemic.

In March 2018, Disney Cruise Line released the first rendering of its new generation of cruise ships. The 140,000-ton cruise liners will be LNG-powered and will accommodate at least 2,500 guests.

In September 2022, Disney Cruise Line announced the next ship in their fleet, the Disney Treasure, at the D23 Expo. The ship will be inspired by the theme of adventure, with the Grand Hall inspired by the grandeur and mystery of a gilded palace which draws on inspiration from real-world Asia and Africa, as well as paying homage to Agrabah.

In November 2022, Disney announced it would acquire the partially completed Global Dream that was intended to enter service for the now defunct Dream Cruises. Disney acquired the ship for €40 million, a discount from the original value of €1.8 billion. The ship will have a capacity of 6,000, and will be powered by green methanol. Construction will carry out at MV Werften shipyard in Wismar, Germany, under the management of Meyer Werft, who has completed Disney's other ships. It is expected to enter service in late 2024 and will be based outside of the United States.

Related facilities

Disney Cruise Line Terminal

The Disney Cruise Line Terminal, or Port Canaveral's Cruise Terminal 8, is located in Port Canaveral in Cape Canaveral, Florida, United States. It is used to transport passengers on and off of the Disney Cruise Line ships. This port has seen the departure of the Disney Magic, the Disney Wonder, the Disney Dream, the Disney Fantasy, and the Disney Wish.

The port, located in Port Canaveral, at cruise terminal A, is a large building, owned by Port Canaveral, and operated by the Walt Disney Company. At , this massive building includes the base for Disney Cruise Line check-in, security, and boarding. The terminal was designed loosely on the old Ocean Terminal in Southampton.

Disney Cruise Line has negotiated with the Port Canaveral port authority in early 2009, extending their contract until 2022. As part of this contract, the port authority expanded and upgraded the dock in order to accommodate the new ships (both of which will be home-ported there), the terminal will be enlarged to accommodate more passengers and luggage, and a parking garage was built. The Disney Dream, the Disney Wonder, the Disney Magic, the Disney Fantasy, and the Disney Wish have departed from Port Canaveral.

In June 2018, Port Canaveral officials approved pursuing a study about how to best upgrade Disney's Terminal 8 and other nearby terminals. With the Disney fleet expected to expand from four to seven ships, Port Canaveral Chief Executive Officer John Murray stated that, without expansion, "we'll have more activity than Terminal 8 can handle." The Canaveral Port Authority Board of Commissioners in January 2019 approved work for Disney's Terminal 8 and adjacent Terminal 10, which would handle more ships when the new class arrives. The upgrades would allow Disney to base three ships year round at the port. 

In April 2022, it was approved by the Broward County Commission that Port Everglades' Cruise Terminal 4 would be transformed into a second homeport for Disney Cruise Line, alongside Disney's original homeport, Port Canaveral's Cruise Terminal 8. This will mark the first time that Disney Cruise Line sails from Port Everglades. This project is expected to be completed by Fall of 2023. Disney Dream will be the first ship to be located at Port Everglades.

Lighthouse Point

Lighthouse Point, Bahamas, or simply Lighthouse Point, is a private peninsula in The Bahamas which serves as an exclusive port for the Disney Cruise Line ships. It is located in the south-eastern region of  Bannerman Town, Eleuthera. In March 2019, The Walt Disney Company purchased the peninsula from the Bahamian government, giving the company control over the area.

References

External links

 

 
Cruise lines
Transport companies established in 1996
1996 establishments in Florida